Sames may refer to:

People 
Given name
 Sames I, Orontid king of Commagene and Sophene
 Sames II Theosebes Dikaios (died 109 BC), Orontid king of Commagene

Surname
 Albert Morris Sames (1873–1958), American judge
 Heinz Sames (1911–1944), German speed skater
 Ștefan Sameș (1951–2011), Romanian professional football player

Places 
 Sames, Pyrénées-Atlantiques, France
 Sames (Amieva), Asturias, Spain